Larry Jamill Kelly (born October 25, 1977) is an American freestyle wrestler. He represented the United States at the 2004 Summer Olympic Games where he earned a silver medal.  He is currently a part of the University of North Carolina At Chapel Hill Wrestling coaching staff as well as being the head coach for the Tar Heel Wrestling Club RTC in Chapel Hill.

Early life

Kelly was born in Atwater, California, where he attended Atwater High School and placed fourth in the state wrestling tournament as a senior.  He spent one year at Lassen Community College then transferred to Oklahoma State where he became a three time letter winner.

2004 Olympics
Though he never won a state high school tournament or a national title in college, Kelly did win the 2004 USA Nationals and the US Olympic trials at 66 kg (145.5 lbs) to represent the US in Athens.  After winning both pool matches 3-0, he defeated eventual bronze medalist Makhach Murtazaliev of Russia in the semifinal, 3-1.  In the Gold Medal match, Kelly faced Ukrainian Elbrus Tedeyev.  Tedeyev would win the gold 3-1 leaving Kelly with the silver.

Coaching career
 The photo is from Kelly's coaching career:
Up until August 2010 he was the head coach of Dallas Dynamite Wrestling Club in Dallas, Texas. In 2015, he became a guest wrestling coach for Daniel Cormier, Luke Rockhold and Cain Velasquez, all from the American Kickboxing Academy.
Kelly has coached at Cal Poly and NC State University,  and was an Associate Head Wrestling Coach at Stanford University. Kelly coached at Arizona State University from May 2018 until March 2020. In October 2020, Kelly was named as an assistant coach at UNC-Chapel Hill.

References

 

1977 births
Living people
Wrestlers at the 2004 Summer Olympics
Olympic silver medalists
Medalists at the 2004 Summer Olympics
American male sport wrestlers
People from Atwater, California
Pan American Games medalists in wrestling
Pan American Games silver medalists for the United States
Wrestlers at the 2003 Pan American Games
Medalists at the 2003 Pan American Games
20th-century American people
21st-century American people